Omar Blebel (4 March 1922 – 1 December 2002) was an Argentine wrestler. He competed at the 1948 Summer Olympics and the 1952 Summer Olympics.

References

External links
 

1922 births
2002 deaths
Argentine male sport wrestlers
Olympic wrestlers of Argentina
Wrestlers at the 1948 Summer Olympics
Wrestlers at the 1952 Summer Olympics
Sportspeople from Rosario, Santa Fe
Wrestlers at the 1951 Pan American Games
Pan American Games gold medalists for Argentina
Pan American Games medalists in wrestling
Medalists at the 1951 Pan American Games